Carol Ann Mansell (born October 1, 1946) is an American film and television actress, best known for her first television role: Ethel MacDoogan (aka Angel 972), the main character in the sitcom Down to Earth, running on WTBS from 1983 to 1987.

After the cancellation of Down to Earth, Mansell has mainly appeared in individual television episodes. Her recurring roles include parts in Married... with Children, Seinfeld, That '70s Show, Desperate Housewives, Days of Our Lives, The King of Queens, and a 2012 episode of Justified. She also appeared in the Season 9 episode of Friends "The One in Barbados Part 1" as a fan of Joey's. Her most prominent film role is as Collette Marshall in the 2000 biopic/horror film In the Light of the Moon. Other film appearances include those in The Couch Trip and Thelma & Louise. She has also appeared in the audio drama [Adventures in Odyssey] playing the character of “Eleanor Wise.”

Filmography

References

External links

American film actresses
American television actresses
Living people
1946 births
21st-century American women